Live! is the second live album (seventh total album) released by the singer-songwriter Jonathan Edwards. It was recorded in September 1980 and released later that year.

Reception

Rob Theakston from Allmusic gave Live! three out of five stars.

Track listing
  "Sunshine" – 3:15 
  "Sailboat" – 3:05 
  "Daddy's Gone Singin'" – 2:54 
  "Lady" – 5:04 
  "Medley: Don't Cry Blue/Athens County" – 5:13 
  "Everybody Knows Her" – 2:42 
  "Emma" – 4:16 
  "Shanty" – 11:14 
  "Sometimes" – 4:21

Personnel

Jim Biggins – saxophone
Amy Brogger – producer
R.Z. Bunk – bass
Steve Canava – audio engineer
James Collier – composer
Tim Collins – personal manager
Gerald M. Cordasco – drums
Bob DeMuth – audio engineer
Joe Dolce – composer
Jonathan Edwards – guitar, harmonica, piano, producer, vocals
Jeff Golub – guitar
Peggy Greene – photography
John Kimbrough – composer

Malcolm McKinney – composer
Fred Meuller – production crew
Greg Morto] – producer, production crew
William O'Connell – photography
Jon Pousette-Dart – guest appearance
Steve "Spaz" Schnee – digital transfers
Starfleet Blair – audio engineer
Livingston Taylor – guest appearance
Brian Walker – production crew
Howie Weinberg – mastering
Cheryl Wheeler – vocals
Kenny White – keyboards, vocals
Steve Whitney – percussion

Adapted from Allmusic.

References 

1980 live albums
Jonathan Edwards (musician) albums